Ishaq Samejo is Pakistani poet, writer and literary critic of Sindhi Language.

Early life
It is mentioned in Encyclopedia Sindhiana by Sindhi Language Authority that Samejo was born to Jaaro Khan on 18 March 1975 at village Fazulpur, Dadu District, Sindh.

Education
Ishaq Samejo received his early education from his hometown. He got  matriculation from Talibul Moula High School Dadu and higher secondary education from degree college Johi town. He did MA in Sindhi literature from Sindh University. He did PhD in Sindhi literature as well.

Career
Ishaq Samejo started his literary career as poet and critic from 1990. He was appointed as lecturer and now he is working as professor of Sindhi language in University of Sindh, Jamshoro. Samejo remained in charge of Mirza Kalich Beg chair University of Sindh and He rendered his services as Director of Institute of Sindhology, University of Sindh Pakistan. He has attended many national and international conferences and presented his papers about literature, culture and cultural heritage of Sindh in literary conferences held in India, Thailand, Malaysia including in other parts of Pakistan. His many valuable books are published.
Ishaq Samejo is also member of advisory board of Sindhi Boli journal by Sindhi Language Authority Hyderabad Sindh. Currently he serves as Chairman of Sindhi department of Sindh university. He has compiled many books of poetry of Shaikh Ayaz and Wafa Nathanshahi.

Books
Duniya Joon lok Aakhaniyoon (Hyderabad: Zindagi, 1998) – compilation
Tareekhi Manhoon Tareekhi Galhioon (Part i & Part ii) (Hyderabad: Sohni, 1998) – compilation
Sada Bechain Aahe (Hyderabad: Naon Janam, 2001)
Dil Jo Rasto, Ghazals (Hyderabad: Roshni Kandiaro, 2003) – compilation
Geroo Ves Ghazal (Kandiaro/Hydrabad: Roshni, 2004) – compilation
Shairi Saan Dushmani (Hyderabad: Naon Janam, 2005) – criticism
Gunaah Ja Geet (Kandiaro/Hydrabad: Roshni, 2006) – poetry 
Hikrri Huie Benazir (Kandiaro/Hydrabad: Roshni, 2008) – compilation
Nav-a Halee Aa Geet Khani (Kandiaro/Hydrabad: Roshni, 2009) – compilation

References

Pakistani poets
Sindhi-language poets
Sindhi people